70–10 Tour is a series of live albums from the English rock band Supertramp's 70-10 tour, commemorating the 40th anniversary of the band. Each concert from the tour was recorded and released on CD or as an MP3 download. Although "Don't You Lie to Me" only appears on the album from the second Paris concert, the final show of the tour, there are few differences in set lists (with "Asylum" played only twice in Freiburg and Verona between "Downstream" and "Rudy").

List of shows released

Set list (Paris, 28 October 2010)

 All songs written by Rick Davies and Roger Hodgson, except where noted.
 All lead vocals by Rick Davies, except where noted.

Personnel 
Rick Davies – Keyboards, harmonica, lead & backing vocals
Jesse Siebenberg – Guitar, keyboards, percussion, lead & backing vocals
John Helliwell – Saxophones, clarinet, melodica, backing vocals, MC
Bob Siebenberg – Drums and percussion
Cliff Hugo – Bass guitar
Carl Verheyen – Guitar, backing vocals
Lee Thornburg – Trumpets, tuba, melodica, additional keyboards, backing vocals
Gabe Dixon – Keyboards, percussion, lead & backing vocals
Cassie Miller – Backing vocals

References 

Supertramp live albums
2010 live albums